Furner may refer to:

People with the surname
 David Furner (born 1971), Australian rugby league footballer and coach (son of Don Furner)
 Don Furner (born 1932), Australian rugby league footballer and coach (father of David Furner)
 Fanny Furner (1864–1938), Australian human rights activist
 Jim Furner (1927–2007), Australian military intelligence officer, director-general of ASIS (1984–1992)
 Luke Furner (1837–1912), Australian politician
 Mark Furner (born 1958), Australian politician
 Mary O. Furner, American historian

Places
 Furner, South Australia, a locality
 Furner's Green, an English hamlet